Arwa Al-Hujali was Saudi Arabia's first woman trainee lawyer.

Al-Hujali graduated from King Abdulaziz University in Jeddah in 2010. Initially denied registration as a lawyer, she petitioned the Saudi Ministry of Justice for three years before they granted her application.

In May 2013, Al-Hujaili became the first trainee woman lawyer in Saudi Arabia. In November 2013, Sara Aalamri, Jehan Qurban, Bayan Mahmoud Al-Zahran and Ameera Quqani became the first four female licensed attorneys. Prior to the licensing of the Saudi women, female law graduates were only allowed to serve as legal consultants.

See also 
 First women lawyers around the world

References 

Year of birth missing (living people)
Living people
21st-century Saudi Arabian lawyers
Saudi Arabian women lawyers
Place of birth missing (living people)
King Abdulaziz University alumni